Your Show Time is an American anthology drama series that debuted on NBC Television on the East Coast in September 1948 and then on both the East and the West Coast, as a network show, on January 21, 1949.

The show was produced by Marshall Grant for Grant Productions and Stanley Rubin for Realm Productions. The series was hosted and narrated by Arthur Shields, aired on Friday evenings, and ran until July 15, 1949. The series was sponsored by Lucky Strike cigarettes, and was later syndicated as Film Drama in 1955 and Story Theater in 1956.

Production background
Filmed by Grant Productions at Hal Roach Studios, Your Show Time was American television's first dramatic series to be shot on film instead of being aired on live television or as a kinescope. The series Public Prosecutor was produced on film in 1947–48, for a planned September 1948 debut, but remained unaired until DuMont aired that series in 1951–52.

Your Show Time is also notable for being the first series to win an Emmy Award. The 1949 episode "The Necklace", produced by Stanley Rubin, won the Emmy Award as Outstanding Made For Television Movie.

Synopsis
The show featured half-hour dramatizations of stories by renowned authors such as Guy de Maupassant, Charles Dickens, Arthur Conan Doyle, Victor Hugo, Robert Louis Stevenson, Frank Stockton, and Mark Twain. Other episodes were adapted from chapters of novels, such as The Bishop's Experiment, an adaptation of the section featuring the bishop in Victor Hugo's Les Misérables with Leif Erickson as Jean Valjean. An adaptation of "The Adventure of the Speckled Band" marked one of the earliest known television appearances of Sherlock Holmes.

Cast
The show featured appearances by such actors as Julie Adams, Robert Alda, Evelyn Ankers, Morris Carnovsky, Melville Cooper, Reginald Denny, William Frawley, Eva Gabor, Hurd Hatfield, Hugo Haas, Sterling Holloway, Marjorie Lord, Alan Napier, Dan O'Herlihy, Eve Miller, Gene Reynolds, and Selena Royle.

Critical reception
A review of "The Diamond Necklace" episode in the trade publication Variety found it to be "not good television" and "a dull half-hour." The review noted that a long commercial and a long introduction by the narrator took up almost five minutes before the first dialog was heard. In addition to that "deadly beginning", it said that the rest of the episode offered "little action".

Sale
In January 1950 Jerry Fairbanks Inc. bought "full rights for television, films and allied media" for the 26 episodes of Your Show Time.

Preservation status
At least nine episodes survive at the UCLA Film and Television Archive.

Episodes

Awards

See also
1948-49 United States network television schedule

References

External links

Your Show Time at CTVA with cast list for each episode

Vintage 45's Blog
 YouTube uploads of episodes from Your Show Time: "The Adventure of the Speckled Band", "The Mummy's Foot"

1940s American anthology television series
1949 American television series debuts
1949 American television series endings
1940s American drama television series
Black-and-white American television shows
NBC original programming
English-language television shows